The Tauernscheck goat breed from Austria is used for the production of milk.  It is a very rare breed derived from the Austrian Landrace and Pinzgauer goat breeds.

Sources
 

Goat breeds
Dairy goat breeds
Goat breeds originating in Austria